Galium jepsonii, with the common name Jepson's bedstraw, is a rare flowering plant species in the Rubiaceae — Madder family.

The species name honors renowned California botanist Willis Linn Jepson.

Distribution
The plant is endemic to Southern California, native to open Red fir forest habitats in the Eastern Transverse Ranges. It is found in the San Bernardino Mountains and San Gabriel Mountains, within Los Angeles County and San Bernardino County.

It grows form  in elevation.

Description
The bell-shaped flowers are white to pink, with a bloom period of July and August. It is dioecious, with male and female flowers on separate plants.

It is a Vulnerable species on the California Native Plant Society Inventory of Rare and Endangered Plants, and is protected within the San Gabriel Mountains National Monument and Angeles National Forest, and the San Bernardino National Forest.

See also

References

External links
Calflora Database: Galium jepsonii (Jepson's bedstraw)
 Jepson Manual eFlora (TJM2) treatment of Galium jepsonii
Gardening Europe: Galium jepsonii
UC Photos gallery of  Galium jepsonii (Jepson's bedstraw)

jepsonii
Endemic flora of California
~
~
Natural history of Los Angeles County, California
Natural history of San Bernardino County, California
Natural history of the Transverse Ranges
~
~
~
Plants described in 1934
Dioecious plants
Flora without expected TNC conservation status